The Cumbria Coastal Way (CCW) is a long-distance footpath in Cumbria in northern England, following the coast from Silverdale, just over the Lancashire border, to just north of the Anglo-Scottish border. It is now part of the England Coast Path.

The Long Distance Walkers Association reports, that "The route is no longer marked on OS maps and is not endorsed by Cumbria County Council; some permissive paths no longer have access rights so diversions are necessary in places."

The path follows some interesting scenery such as the red sandstone cliffs of St. Bees Head.  It passes through the following locations (from South to North):
Silverdale, Lancashire - 
Arnside
Grange-over-Sands
Greenodd
Ulverston
Barrow-in-Furness
Askam-in-Furness
Kirkby-in-Furness
Broughton-in-Furness
Millom
Ravenglass
Seascale
St. Bees
St. Bees Head
Whitehaven
Workington
Maryport
Allonby
Mawbray
Beckfoot
Silloth
Abbeytown
Burgh by Sands
Carlisle -

References

External links

CCW & Lakeland Walks 
Ramblers Association Cumbria Coastal Way

Coastal paths in England
Footpaths in Cumbria
Long-distance footpaths in England